The Strangford Apollo is an Ancient Greek sculpture of a nude boy, with the arms and lower legs missing.  It dates to around 490 BC, making it one of the latest examples of the kouros type of statue, and is made of Parian marble.  The sculpture has been in British Museum's collection since 1864, when the museum acquired it from the collection of Percy Smythe, 8th Viscount Strangford.

Function 
The Strangford Apollo may have been a cult statue because it was found on the island Anafi, which harbors the remains of the temple of Apollo.

References 

Ancient Greek and Roman sculptures in the British Museum
5th-century BC Greek sculptures
Marble sculptures in the United Kingdom
Archaeological discoveries in Greece
Sculptures of Apollo
Cult images